Henry Pfeiffer (1857–1939) was president of William R. Warner Co., manufacturing pharmaceutists, and a philanthropist. According to his New York Times obituary, he made large donations to educational institutions and the Methodist church.

Career and personal life 

Pfeiffer founded Pfeiffer Chemical Company in 1901. In 1908 he acquired William R. Warner Co. Under Pfeiffer's leadership William R. Warner became a leading drug company.

References 

1857 births
1939 deaths
19th-century American businesspeople